Majid Sharif-Vaghefi (1949–1975) was a leading member of the People's Mujahedin of Iran (MEK) who was murdered in an internal purge staged by the MEK Marxist faction. One of the three members of the MEK's central committee from 1972 to 1975, he was considered the leader of the group's Muslim faction that refused to accept Marxism.

Early life and background 
He came from a "highly devout middle-class family" and was raised in Isfahan and Tehran. He studied electrical engineering at Aryamehr University of Technology, and became a member of the MEK while he was studying on a scholarship in Abadan's technical college.

Murder 

By the spring of 1975, when the majority of the MEK turned to Marxism, he was given an ultimatum by the other two members of the central committee who became Marxists, Taghi Shahram and Bahram Aram, to accept the new ideology. In order to "raise his political consciousness", he was given the chance to choose between a move to the MEK cell in Mashhad, leaving the country or to work in factories for a while. Sharif-Vaghefi pretended that he wanted to go to Mashhad, but instead moved some of the MEK arms and equipment to a new hiding place and tried to organize the part of the MEK that resisted the ideology change. His wife, part of the Marxist faction, provided Shahram and Aram with information on his activities. Mainly on Shahram's initiative, Sharif-Vaghefi was killed and his body was immolated and dumped outside the city. SAVAK managed to find the remnants of the body.

Legacy 
Following the Iranian Revolution, the place he studied was renamed to "Sharif University of Technology" in his honour. He is still celebrated as a martyr by the Iranian government.

References

1949 births
1975 deaths
Early People's Mojahedin Organization of Iran members
Iranian murder victims
People murdered in Iran
Iranian revolutionaries
People assassinated by the People's Mojahedin Organization of Iran
Sharif University of Technology alumni